Asnate Lindermane (born 25 April 2001) is a Latvian footballer who plays as a goalkeeper for Talsu and the Latvia national team.

International career
Lindermane made her debut for the Latvia national team on 10 June 2021, against Lithuania.

References

2001 births
Living people
Women's association football goalkeepers
Latvian women's footballers
Latvia women's international footballers